Rufus King Polk (August 23, 1866 – March 5, 1902) was a Democratic member of the U.S. House of Representatives from Pennsylvania from 1899 to 1902.

Life and career
Rufus K. Polk was born in Columbia, Tennessee, the son of Confederate States Army Brigadier General Lucius E. Polk and great-nephew of Leonidas Polk. He attended Webb's Academy in Culleoka, Tennessee, graduated from Lehigh University in South Bethlehem, Pennsylvania, in 1887, and took a post-graduate course in mining engineering.

He settled in Danville, Pennsylvania, and was employed as a chemist. He held supervisory positions with several steel companies and ultimately became engaged in the manufacture of structural iron. He served as first lieutenant of Company F, Twelfth Regiment, Pennsylvania Volunteer Infantry, in the Spanish–American War. He was a delegate to the 1900 Democratic National Convention.

Polk was elected as a Democrat to the Fifty-sixth and Fifty-seventh Congresses and served until his death in Philadelphia, Pennsylvania.

He is buried in Fairview Cemetery in Danville, Pennsylvania.

See also
 List of United States Congress members who died in office (1900–49)

Sources
 
 The Political Graveyard
 

1866 births
1902 deaths
Lehigh University alumni
People from Danville, Pennsylvania
People from Columbia, Tennessee
Democratic Party members of the United States House of Representatives from Pennsylvania
Rufus K.
19th-century American politicians
American military personnel of the Spanish–American War
United States Army officers
Military personnel from Pennsylvania